The following is a list of events affecting American television in 2008. Events listed include television show debuts, finales, cancellations, and new channel launches.

Notable events

January

February

March

April

May

June

July

August

September

October

November

December

Programs

Debuts
The following is a list of shows that premiered in 2008.

Entering syndication this year

Changes of network affiliation

Returning this year

Ending this year

Made-for-TV movies

Miniseries

Networks and services

Network launches

Network closures

Television stations

Station launches

Network affiliation changes

Station closures

Births

Deaths

See also
 2008 in the United States
 List of American films of 2008

References

External links
 NYPost
List of 2008 American television series at IMDb

 
2000s in American television